The 2004 Greek Cup Final was the 60th final of the Greek Cup. The match took place on 8 May 2004 at Nea Smyrni Stadium. The contesting teams were Panathinaikos and Olympiacos. It was Panathinaikos' twenty fifth Greek Cup Final in their 96-year history and Olympiacos' thirtieth Greek Cup Final in their 79 years of existence. The final was originally scheduled to take place at the Pampeloponnisiako Stadium in Patras, but at the last minute the approval for its performance was not given after the refusal of the Achaia Police Department, for fear of provoking incidents by the fans of both teams and even a few months before the Olympic Games, and Patras was among the Olympic cities. Finally, following recommendations from the Minister of Public Order, George Voulgarakis, that the final should be held within the Attica Basin for the best possible policing, it was decided to take place at the Nea Smyrni Stadium, as the Olympic Stadium, due to upcoming games, was in the final phase of its reconstruction. Initially, the mayor of Nea Smyrni and president of the amateur Panionios, George Koutelakis, expressed his opposition and refusal to concede the stadium and for security reasons the number of tickets available for sale was limited.

Venue

This was the first Greek Cup Final held at the Nea Smyrni Stadium.

The Nea Smyrni Stadium was built in 1939 and was renovated twice, in 2001 and 2003. The stadium is used as a venue for Panionios. Its current capacity is 11,342.

Background
Panathinaikos had reached the Greek Cup Final twenty four times, winning fifteen of them. The last time that they had won the Cup was in 1995 (1–0 against AEK Athens). The last time that had played in a Final was in 1999, where they had lost to Olympiacos by 2–0.

Olympiacos had reached the Greek Cup Final twenty nine times, winning twenty of them. The last time that they had won the Cup was in 1999 (2–0 against Panathinaikos). The last time that had played in a Final was in 2002, where they had lost to AEK Athens by 2–1.

Route to the final

Match

Details

See also
2003–04 Greek Football Cup

References

2004
Cup Final
Greek Cup Final 2004
Greek Cup Final 2004
Sports competitions in Athens
May 2004 sports events in Europe